Rebel in Town is a 1956 American Western film directed by Alfred L. Werker and starring John Payne, Ruth Roman, J. Carrol Naish and Ben Cooper.

Plot
Home from the Civil War, where he fought for the Union army, John Willoughby now lives in the western town of Kittreck Wells with wife Nora and their 7-year-old son, Petey. An appeal for help from Marshal Russell comes when a band of former Confederate soldiers are seen pulling a robbery in a neighboring town. John, who hates all rebels, agrees to go, against his wife's wishes that all his fighting must end.

Meanwhile, the Rebels, Bedloe Mason and his sons Gray, Wesley, Cain and Frank, decide to ride into Kittreck Wells to replenish their dwindling water supply. Bedloe sends Gray, Frank and Wesley into town while he and Cain await their return. Petey Willoughby, who shares his father's dislike of rebels, aims and fires a cap pistol at them. Startled by the sound, Wesley Mason shoots and kills the boy. As the brothers mount their horses and gallop out of town, Gray, not having been witnessing the shooting, hesitates, then catches up to the others.

When they reach Bedloe and Cain, Gray, angered by his brother’s recklessness, appeals to his father and brothers that Wesley has to go back to face the consequences. Wesley is dead-set against this and the others take his side. Gray rides off alone to learn the fate of the boy, but Wesley ambushes his brother by throwing a knife into his back. After strapping his brother’s unconscious body onto his horse, Wesley sets the animal loose. He then returns to camp and reports that Gray refused to listen to reason, but will meet the family at Oak Fork in three days. That night, John finds the wandering horse bearing Gray’s body and takes him home.

Wesley lies to his father that Gray will meet them in the next town. Gray's horse wanders into town, where John and Nora remove the wounded man from the saddle and take him into their home. John is still determined to learn who killed the child, and an eyewitness accuses Gray of being one of the gang. Nora has to stop her husband from attacking Gray with an axe.

The marshal places Gray under arrest until a trial can be convened. A lynch mob threatens to drag him out of the jail. Bedloe, meanwhile, realizes Wesley has been lying. He ties his son to a tree and whips him until Wesley confesses what really happened. Just as the vigilantes are about to hang Gray, the Masons ride into town. When it is evident to all that Wesley is the guilty one, he runs from the mob. Gray follows and then fights with Wesley, who knocks Gray out and then pulls a knife. John, finally aware who really killed the boy, arrives in time to stop Wesley from stabbing the unconscious Gray. John and Wesley fight and Wesley is stabbed and dies. Mason and his boys leave peacefully. John embraces Nora.

Cast
 John Payne as John Willoughby
 Ruth Roman as Nora Willoughby
 J. Carrol Naish as Bedloe Mason
 Ben Cooper as Gray Mason
 John Smith as Wesley Mason
 Ben Johnson as Frank Mason
 Sterling Franck as Cain Mason (as Cain Mason)
 Bobby Clark as Peter Willoughby
 Mimi Gibson as Lisbeth Ackstadt
 Mary Adams as Grandma Ackstadt
 James Griffith as Adam Russell
 Joel Ashley as Doctor

Reception 
Paul Mavis of DVD Talk rated it 3.5/5 stars and called it "a surprisingly nimble, efficient B-western with a lot going on under the surface".

TV Guide rated it 3/4 stars and called it "a finely scripted, produced, and acted film".

See also
List of American films of 1956

References

External links
 
 
 

1956 films
1956 Western (genre) films
American Western (genre) films
American black-and-white films
United Artists films
Films directed by Alfred L. Werker
Films scored by Les Baxter
1950s English-language films
1950s American films